Yevgeni Aleksandrovich Smirnov (born 27 May 1994) is a Russian football player.

Club career
He made his professional debut in the Russian Professional Football League for FC Yakutiya Yakutsk on 23 April 2014 in a game against FC Sibir-2 Novosibirsk.

He made his Russian Football National League debut for FC Luch-Energiya Vladivostok on 29 October 2017 in a game against FC Tom Tomsk.

References

External links
 
 

1994 births
Sportspeople from Vladivostok
Living people
Russian footballers
Association football defenders
FC Luch Vladivostok players
FC Nosta Novotroitsk players